Molla Mahalleh (also Romanized as Mollā Maḩalleh) is a village in Gatab-e Shomali Rural District, Gatab District, amirkola city, Mazandaran Province, Iran. At the 2006 census, its population was 236, in 61 families.

References 

Populated places in Babol County